Robert Paul Arthur (June 18, 1925 – October 1, 2008) was an American motion picture actor who appeared in dozens of films in the 1940s and 1950s.

Biography 
After working in radio and serving in the Navy during World War II, Arthur moved to Hollywood, where his first role was as Rosalind Russell’s son in Roughly Speaking in 1945. He soon was signed to a studio contract with Warners and appeared in films including Too Young to Know, Night and Day and Nora Prentiss. He also appeared in the 1949 war film Twelve O'Clock High as the comic relief–providing Sgt. McIllhenny, in the 1951 Billy Wilder film Ace in the Hole, and in the 1950s television program The Lone Ranger. Arthur was known for playing youthful teenage or young adult roles.

Arthur supported Barry Goldwater in the 1964 United States presidential election.

In his later years, Arthur became an activist for gay rights on behalf of senior citizens, and was involved with the Log Cabin Republicans.
 
Robert Arthur died in Aberdeen, Washington, on October 1, 2008, from heart failure, aged 83.

Partial filmography

Roughly Speaking (1945) - Frankie at 17
Mildred Pierce (1945) - High School Boy (uncredited)
Danger Signal (1945) - Hotel Boy (uncredited)
Too Young to Know (1945) - Jimmy
Her Kind of Man (1946) - Copy Boy (uncredited)
Night and Day (1946) - Customer (uncredited)
Nobody Lives Forever (1946) - Bellhop (uncredited)
Sweetheart of Sigma Chi (1946) - Harry Townsend
Nora Prentiss (1947) - Gregory Talbot
The Devil on Wheels (1947) - Todd Powell
Mother Wore Tights (1947) - Bob Clarkman
Green Grass of Wyoming (1948) - Ken McLaughlin
Yellow Sky (1948) - Bull Run
Mother Is a Freshman (1949) - Beaumont Jackson
You're My Everything (1949) - Harold - College Boy in "Heart of a Co-Ed"
Twelve O'Clock High (1949) - Sgt. McIllhenny
September Affair (1950) - David Lawrence Jr
Air Cadet (1951) - Walt Carver
Ace in the Hole (1951) - Herbie Cook
On the Loose (1951) - Larry Lindsay
Belles on Their Toes (1952) - Frank Gilbreth, Jr.
The Ring (1952) - Billy Smith
Just For You (1952) - Jerry Blake
The System (1953) - Rex Merrick
Young Bess (1953) - Barnaby
Take the High Ground! (1953) - Donald Quentin Dover IV
Return from the Sea (1954) - Porter
Top of the World (1955) - Lt. Skip McGuire
The Desperados Are in Town (1956) - Lonny Kesh
Three Violent People (1956) - One-Legged Confederate Soldier (uncredited)
Hellcats of the Navy (1957) - Freddy Warren
Young and Wild (1958) - Jerry Coltrin
Wild Youth (1960) - Frankie

References

External links

 
 
 

1925 births
2008 deaths
American male film actors
American male television actors
Radio and television announcers
Male actors from Washington (state)
American LGBT rights activists
People from Aberdeen, Washington
20th-century American male actors